Edwin Le Roy Antony (January 5, 1852 – January 16, 1913) served in the U.S. House of Representatives from the State of Texas from June 14, 1892 to March 4, 1893, following the resignation of Roger Mills. Antony attended the University of Georgia where he was a member of the Phi Kappa Literary Society and the Fraternity of Phi Gamma Delta. Antony had previously been prosecuting attorney of Milam County and a district judge. Edwin Le Roy Antony died in Dallas, Texas, and was buried in Oakland Cemetery.

References

External links

politicalgraveyard.com bio

1852 births
1913 deaths
People from Burke County, Georgia
Politicians from Dallas
People from Milam County, Texas
Texas lawyers
Democratic Party members of the United States House of Representatives from Texas
19th-century American politicians
Burials at Oakland Cemetery (Dallas, Texas)
Lawyers from Dallas
19th-century American lawyers